Raymond Tripier (1838–1916) was a French physician and pathologist.

He was a patron of the arts, after retiring from teaching he devoted his time to museum work in Lyon.

Written works 
He is remembered for his studies of cardiovascular and respiratory diseases,  (Anatomo-clinical studies of the heart, vessels and lungs, 1909). Another principal work of his was a treatise on pathological anatomy titled  (1904). Other noted writings by Tripier include:
 , with Léon Bouveret, 1886 (Typhoid fever: treatment by cold baths).
 , with Léon Bouveret, 1889	
 , with Jean Paviot, 1909 (Role of subhepatic peritonitis in the pathogenesis of abdominal hernias).
 , 1911 (Instinct and intelligence: a synthetic function of the human organism for its preservation: practical applications in various phases of life).	
 , 1913.

References 
 IDREF.fr (biographical information)

French pathologists
Academic staff of the University of Lyon
1838 births
1916 deaths